Bedknobs and Broomsticks is a 1971 American live-action animated musical fantasy film directed by Robert Stevenson and produced by Bill Walsh for Walt Disney Productions. It is loosely based upon the books The Magic Bedknob; or, How to Become a Witch in Ten Easy Lessons (1944) and Bonfires and Broomsticks (1947) by English children's author Mary Norton. The film stars Angela Lansbury, David Tomlinson, John Ericson, and introduces Ian Weighill, Cindy O'Callaghan, and Roy Snart.

During the early 1960s, Bedknobs and Broomsticks entered development when the negotiations for the film rights to Mary Poppins (1964) were placed on hold. When the rights were acquired, the film was shelved repeatedly due to the similarities with Mary Poppins until it was revived in 1969. Originally at a length of 139 minutes, Bedknobs and Broomsticks was edited down to just under two hours prior to its premiere at the Radio City Music Hall in New York City. As with Mary Poppins, the Sherman Brothers composed the film's songs.

The film was released on October 7, 1971, to mixed reviews from film critics, some of whom praised the live-action/animated sequence. The film received five Academy Awards nominations winning one for Best Special Visual Effects. This was the last Disney film to be released prior to the death of Walt Disney's surviving brother, Roy O. Disney, who died two months later. It is also the last theatrical film Reginald Owen appeared in before his death the next year in 1972; his last two acting credits were for television.

In 1996, the film was restored with most of the deleted material re-inserted back into the film. A stage musical adaptation has been produced. The musical had its world premiere at the Theatre Royal, in Newcastle upon Tyne, on August 14, 2021 before embarking on a UK and Ireland tour, until May 2022.

Plot
In August 1940, during the Battle of Britain, three children named Charlie, Carrie, and Paul Rawlins are evacuated from London to Pepperinge Eye, near the Dorset coast, where they are placed in the reluctant care of Miss Eglantine Price. The children discover Miss Price is learning witchcraft through a correspondence school with hopes of using her spells in the British war effort against the Nazis, and offers the children a transportation spell in exchange for their silence. She casts the spell on a bedknob.

Miss Price receives a letter from her school announcing its closure, thus preventing her from learning the final spell. She convinces Paul to use the enchanted bed to return the group to London, and locate the headmaster, Professor Emelius Browne. Browne turns out to be a common street magician who created the course from an old book, and is shocked to learn the spells actually work. He reveals his real reason for closing the school: the book is damaged and the final spell, "Substitutiary Locomotion", is missing. The group travels to Portobello Road to locate the rest of the book. After an exchange with an old bookseller, Miss Price learns that the spell is engraved on a magical medallion called the Star of Astaroth. The bookseller explains that Astaroth used the medallion to anthropomorphise a pack of wild animals, who then killed him and took the Star to a remote island called Naboombu.

The group travels to Naboombu. The bed goes underwater, where Mr. Browne and Miss Price enter a dance contest and win first prize. The bed is fished out of the sea by a bear, who brings the group before the island's ruler, King Leonidas the lion, who is wearing the Star of Astaroth. Leonidas invites Mr. Browne to act as a referee in a  soccer game. The chaotic match ends in Leonidas' self-proclaimed victory, while Mr. Browne swaps the medallion with his referee whistle as he leaves. A furious Leonidas runs towards the group to get the medallion back, but Miss Price turns him into a rabbit in the nick of time.

Back home, Miss Price casts the spell using the magic words from the medallion (Treguna Mekoides Trecorum Satis Dee), which imbues inanimate objects with life. When Miss Price is informed that the children can be moved to another home, she decides to let them stay, realizing she has come to love them and vice versa. The children declare they want Mr. Browne to be their father, but Mr. Browne, wary of commitment, bids goodbye to the group and attempts to take a train back to London. A platoon of Nazi German commandos land on the coast via U-boat as part of an exercise and invade Miss Price's house, imprisoning her and the children in the local museum. At the train station, Mr. Browne fends off two Germans cutting phone lines and heads back to Miss Price's house, using a spell that he taught Miss Price to disguise himself and avoid the Germans. He inspires Miss Price to use the spell to enchant the museum's exhibits into an army. The army of knights' armor and military uniforms chases the Germans away, but as they retreat, they destroy Miss Price's workshop, ending her career as a witch. Though disappointed her career is over, she is happy she played a small part in the war effort.

Shortly afterwards, Mr. Browne enlists in the army and departs with the local Home Guard escorting him, promising the children he will return soon. Paul reveals he still has the enchanted bedknob, hinting they can continue with their adventures.

Cast
 Angela Lansbury as Miss Eglantine Price. Miss Price is initially a somewhat reclusive woman, reluctant to take in children from London as she believes they will get in the way of her witchcraft, which she prefers to keep secret but hopes to use to bring World War II to an end. However, she bonds with the children and falls in love with Mr. Browne during their journey.
 David Tomlinson as Mr. Emelius Browne. Introduced as "Professor Browne," the title by which Miss Price knows him, he is running a Correspondence College of Witchcraft based on what he believes to be "nonsense words" found in an old book. When Miss Price and the children find him in London, he is revealed to be a street performer and con artist, and not a very good one.  He is, however, a smooth talker, which proves useful on the group's adventures, and believes in doing everything "with a flair."  As the adventures unfold, he finds himself developing an attachment to Miss Price and the children, a feeling he struggles with.
 Ian Weighill as Charles "Charlie" Rawlins. Charlie is the eldest of the orphaned Rawlins children; eleven, going on twelve, according to Carrie, an age which Miss Price calls "The Age of Not Believing."  Accordingly, he is initially cynical and disbelieving of Miss Price's magical efforts, but comes around as time goes on; it is at his initial suggestion that Ms. Price uses the Substitutiary Locomotion spell on the museum artifacts.
 Cindy O'Callaghan as Carrie Rawlins.  Slightly younger than Charlie, she takes on a motherly attitude toward her brothers, especially Paul. She is the first to encourage a friendly relationship between Miss Price and the children. 
 Roy Snart as Paul Rawlins.  Paul is about six; his possession of the bedknob and the Isle of Naboombu children's book lead to the group's adventures as well as the eventual solution to the quest for the Substitutiary Locomotion spell.  Paul is prone to blurting out whatever is on his mind, which occasionally leads to trouble.
 Roddy McDowall as Mr. Rowan Jelk, the local clergyman.  Deleted scenes reveal Mr. Jelk to be interested in marrying Miss Price, largely for her property.
 Sam Jaffe as the Bookman, a mysterious criminal also in pursuit of the Substitutiary Locomotion spell.  It is implied that there is some history and bad blood between him and Mr. Browne.
 Bruce Forsyth as Swinburne, a spiv and associate of the Bookman's who acts as his muscle.
 Tessie O'Shea as Mrs. Jessica "Jessie" Hobday, the local postmistress of Pepperinge Eye and chairwoman of the War Activities Committee.
 John Ericson as Colonel Heller, leader of the German raiding party which comes ashore at Pepperinge Eye.
 Reginald Owen as Major General Sir Brian Teagler, commander of the local Home Guard.
 Arthur Gould-Porter as Captain Ainsley Greer, a British Army captain who comes from HQ in London to inspect the Home Guard and becomes lost in the area. He is constantly running into locals who suspect him of being a Nazi in disguise.
 Hank Worden as Old Home Guard Soldier (uncredited)
 Cyril Delevanti as Elderly farmer
 Alan Hewitt as a Soldier

Voices
 Lennie Weinrib as King Leonidas, a lion who is the ruler of the Isle of Naboombu. He is a devoted soccer player with a fearsome temper, as well as a notorious cheat who is known to make up the rules as he goes along – according to Paul's book.
 Lennie Weinrib also voices the Secretary bird, a prim and proper type who often bears the brunt of King Leonidas' temper.
 Dallas McKennon as Fisherman Bear, a brown bear who is a sailor and fisherman on the Isle of Naboombu. He is the one who pulls the bed, with Miss Price's group on it, out of the lagoon with his fishing pole, and takes them to see the King after warning them of his temper.
 Bob Holt as Codfish, a denizen of the Naboombu lagoon who judges the underwater dance contest.

Production
English author Mary Norton published her first children's book, The Magic Bedknob, in 1943. Variety reported in August 1945 that Walt Disney had purchased the film rights to the book. Norton then published Bonfires and Broomsticks in 1947, and the two children's books were then combined into Bed-Knob and Broomsticks in 1957. 

In 1961, Disney was in negotiations for the film rights to Mary Poppins (1964) with P. L. Travers; a film adaptation of Bedknobs and Broomsticks was suggested as an alternative project in case the rights were refused. During the meantime, Disney instructed Robert and Richard Sherman to begin development on the project. Sometime later, the Sherman Brothers held a story conference with producer Bill Walsh and screenwriter Don DaGradi, in which the Shermans sang the song "Eglantine". During the conference, Disney fell asleep in his chair, a moment DaGradi later immortalized in a sketch. Richard Sherman explained, "[Disney] might have been tired that day..." When Disney purchased the rights to Mary Poppins, the project was shelved.

In April 1966, the project re-titled as The Magic Bedpost was placed back into development, with the Sherman Brothers and Irwin Kostal set to resume their musical collaboration. However, the project was shelved again due to the similarities with Mary Poppins (1964). By 1968, the Sherman Brothers' contract with the Disney studios was set to expire. Nevertheless, Walsh called the Shermans into his office telling them to proceed with their work on the film. For several months, the Shermans, Walsh, and DaGradi re-assembled to revise the storyline. Although there was no plan to place the film back into production at the time, Walsh promised the Shermans that he would call them back to the studio to finish the project. He eventually did in November 1969. Throughout 1970 and 1971, the Shermans again reworked their musical compositions for the film. For instance, the song "The Beautiful Briny" was originally written for Mary Poppins (1964) for a scene when Mary spins a compass sending the Banks children to several exotic locations. The Shermans revised the song for Bedknobs and Broomsticks.

Casting
Leslie Caron, Lynn Redgrave, Judy Carne, and Julie Andrews were all considered for the role of Eglantine Price. Andrews was initially offered the part, but hesitated. Walsh later contacted Angela Lansbury, who signed onto the role on October 31, 1969, Halloween. Shortly after, Andrews reconsidered as she felt she owed it to Disney and contacted Walsh again to tell him she would take the role, but learned Lansbury had been cast. Although Peter Ustinov was considered, Ron Moody was originally slated as Emelius Brown, but he refused to star in the film unless he received top billing which the studio would not allow. He was ultimately replaced with David Tomlinson.

The three Rawlins children—Charlie, Carrie, and Paul—were played by Ian Weighill, Cindy O'Callaghan, and Roy Snart respectively. Weighill had previously dropped out of school and began his acting career in an uncredited role as a schoolboy in David Copperfield (1969). He auditioned before Disney talent scouts for one of the child roles in Bedknobs and Broomsticks in London, and was cast as Charlie. Prior to Bedknobs, Snart was a child actor appearing in numerous commercials, and was cast as Paul for his "impish, cheeky look". For the part of Carrie, O'Callaghan had previously acted in television commercials and later made her stage debut in a production of Peter Pan at the Scala Theatre. There, she caught the attention of Disney's talent scouts.

Filming
Filming took place at the Disney studios in Burbank, California from early March to June 10, 1970. The coastal scenes featuring German soldiers were shot on location at a nearby California beach. Additional scenes were shot on location in Corfe Castle in Dorset, England. Filming lasted fifty-seven days while the animation and special effects required five months each to complete.

For the Naboombu soccer sequence, the sodium vapor process was used, which was developed by Petro Vlahos in the 1960s. Animator and director Ward Kimball served as the animation director over the sequence. Directing animator Milt Kahl had designed the characters, but he was angered over the inconsistencies in the character animation. This prompted Kimball to send a memo dated on September 17, 1970, to adhere to animation cohesiveness to the animation staff. Because of the heavy special effects, the entire film had to be storyboarded in advance, shot for shot, in which Lansbury noted her acting was "very by the numbers".

Release
Bedknobs and Broomsticks had an original runtime of 141 minutes, and was scheduled to premiere at the Radio City Music Hall. However, in order to accommodate for the theater's elaborate stage show, the film was trimmed down to two hours, in which 23 minutes were ultimately removed from the film. The removed scenes included a minor subplot involving Roddy McDowall's character (which was reduced to one minute) and three entire musical sequences titled "A Step in the Right Direction", "With a Flair", and "Nobody's Problems". The "Portobello Road" sequence was reduced from about ten minutes down to three.

The movie was reissued theatrically on April 13, 1979, with an additional twenty minutes deleted from the film.

1996 restoration
Intrigued with Lansbury's song, "A Step in the Right Direction" on the original soundtrack album, Scott MacQueen, then–senior manager of Disney's library restoration, set out to restore the film in conjunction with the film's 25th anniversary. Most of the deleted film material was found, but some segments of "Portobello Road" had to be reconstructed from work prints with digital re-coloration to match the film quality of the main content. The footage for "A Step in the Right Direction" was unrecoverable, but the sequence was reconstructed by linking the original music track up to existing production stills. The edit included several newly discovered songs, including "Nobody's Problems", performed by Lansbury. The number had been cut before the premiere of the film. Lansbury had only made a demo recording, singing with a solo piano because the orchestrations would have been added when the picture was scored. When the song was cut, the orchestrations had not yet been added; therefore, it was finally orchestrated and put together when it was placed back into the film.

The soundtrack for some of the spoken tracks was unrecoverable. Therefore, Lansbury and McDowall re-dubbed their parts, while other actors made ADR dubs for those who were unavailable. Even though David Tomlinson was still alive when the film was being reconstructed, he was in ill-health, and unavailable to provide ADR for Emelius Browne, so he was replaced by Jeff Bennett.

The restored version of the film premiered on September 27, 1996, at the Motion Picture Academy of Arts and Sciences in Beverly Hills, California where it was attended by Lansbury, the Sherman Brothers, Ward Kimball, and special effects artist Danny Lee. It was later broadcast on Disney Channel on August 9, 1998.

Home media
In 1980, Disney partnered with Fotomat Corporation on a trial distribution deal, in which Bedknobs and Broomsticks was released on VHS and LaserDisc on March 4, 1980. In October 1982, Disney announced it had partnered with RCA to release nine of their films on the CED videodisc format, of which Bedknobs and Broomsticks was re-released later that same year. The film was re-issued on VHS on October 23, 1989. The film was released on VHS as an installment in the Walt Disney Masterpiece Collection on October 28, 1994.

The restored version of the film was released on VHS and DVD on March 20, 2001, as part of the Walt Disney Gold Classic Collection, to commemorate the 30th anniversary of the film. The reconstruction additionally marked the first time the film was presented in stereophonic sound. The DVD also included a 20-minute making-of featurette with the Sherman Brothers, a recording session with David Tomlinson singing the ending of "Portebello Road", a scrapbook containing thirteen pages of concept art, publicity, and merchandising stills, and a Film Facts supplement of the film's production history.

A new edition called Bedknobs and Broomsticks: Enchanted Musical Edition was released on DVD on September 8, 2009. This new single-disc edition retained the restored version of the film and most of the bonus features from the 2001 DVD release. The movie was released on Special Edition Blu-ray, DVD, and Digital HD on August 12, 2014, in its original 117-minute version, with the deleted scenes used in the previous reconstructed version presented in a separate section on the Blu-ray disc.

Reception

Box office
By January 1974, the film had grossed $8.25 million in box office rentals from the United States and Canada, with its final domestic rentals totaling $8.5 million. The 1979 re-release increased its box office rentals to $11.4 million.

Critical reaction
Vincent Canby of The New York Times wrote that the film is a "tricky, cheerful, aggressively friendly Walt Disney fantasy for children who still find enchantment for pop-up books, plush animals by Steiff and dreams of independent flight." He further highlighted the Naboombu live-action/animated sequence as "the best of Disney, going back all the way to the first Silly Symphonies." Variety wrote that "what it may lack in the charm of [Mary Poppins] it more than measures in inventiveness. Indeed, it is doubtful if special effects or animation have been ever bettered or used to greater advantage. Alone they are a reason for seeing the film" in which the reviewer praised the Naboombu sequence as "not only sheer delights but technical masterpieces." Roger Ebert of the Chicago Sun-Times awarded the film two-and-a-half stars out of four, acknowledging that while the film has the "same technical skill and professional polish" as Mary Poppins, "[i]t doesn't have much of a heart, though, and toward the end you wonder why the Poppins team thought kids would like it much." Gene Siskel of the Chicago Tribune gave it two stars out of four calling the film "a mishmash of story ideas and film styles." He further added that the live action/animated sequence was "one bright spot in the story", but felt "the difference between scenes of sea horses and storm troopers is so great that probably no story could manage it. 'Bedknobs' tries and fails."

Pauline Kael, reviewing for The New Yorker, panned the film, writing that it has "no logic in the style of the movie, and the story dribbles on for so long that it exhausts the viewer before that final magical battle begins." Overall, she claimed "[t]his whole production is a mixture of wizardry and ineptitude; the picture has enjoyable moments but it's as uncertain of itself as the title indicates." Charles Champlin of the Los Angeles Times wrote the film was "pleasant enough and harmless enough. It is also long (almost two hours) and slow. The songs are perfunctory (nothing supercalifragi-whatever) and the visual trickeries, splendid as they are, are sputtery to get the picture truly airborne. By the standards Disney has set for itself, it's a disappointing endeavor." The review aggregator website Rotten Tomatoes reported that the film has an approval rating of 68% with an average rating of 6.1/10 out of 37 reviews. The website's consensus reads: "Bedknobs and Broomsticks often feels like a pale imitation of a certain magical guardian and her wards, but a spoonful of Angela Lansbury's witty star power helps the derivativeness go down." On Metacritic, the film has a score of 59 out of 100 based on 11 reviews, indicating "mixed or average reviews".

Accolades

Music

The musical score for Bedknobs and Broomsticks was composed by Irwin Kostal, with all songs written by Richard M. Sherman and Robert B. Sherman. A soundtrack album was released by Buena Vista Records in 1971. While the film was released in mono sound, the musical score was recorded in stereo and the soundtrack album was released in stereo. An expanded soundtrack album was later released on CD on August 13, 2002.

"The Age of Not Believing" received a nomination for the Academy Award for Best Original Song. "With a Flair", "Don't Let Me Down", and "Nobody's Problems" are only present in the reconstruction. "Solid Citizen" was replaced by the soccer match. Parts of "Fundamental Element" were incorporated into "Don't Let Me Down".

These songs include:

Stage musical adaptation

A stage musical adaptation of Bedknobs and Broomsticks features the songs from the film by the Sherman Brothers with additional music and lyrics by Neil Bartram and a book by Brian Hill. The production is directed by Candice Edmunds and Jamie Harrison and opened at the Theatre Royal, Newcastle in August 2021 and is currently touring the UK and Ireland. It is produced by Michael Harrison, by special arrangement with Disney Theatrical Productions.

See also
 List of American films of 1971
 List of films with live action and animation

Citations

General and cited references

External links

 
 
 
 
 
 

1971 films
1971 musical films
1970s children's animated films
1970s English-language films
1970s fantasy adventure films
1970s musical fantasy films
American films with live action and animation
American children's fantasy films
American fantasy adventure films
American musical fantasy films
Animated films about bears
Animated films about lions
Animated films based on children's books
Battle of Britain films
Films about magic
Films about Nazis
Films about orphans
Films about shapeshifting
Films about witchcraft
Films adapted into plays
Films based on British novels
Films based on children's books
Films based on multiple works of a series
Films directed by Robert Stevenson
Films produced by Bill Walsh (producer)
Films scored by Irwin Kostal
Films set in 1940
Films set in England
Films set in London
Films shot in Burbank, California
Films shot in Dorset
Films that won the Best Visual Effects Academy Award
Musicals about World War II
Musicals by the Sherman Brothers
Walt Disney Pictures films
1970s American films